Telemundo Deportes is the programming division of NBC Sports Group, owned by NBCUniversal, that is responsible for the production of sports events and magazine programs that air on NBCUniversal's Spanish language television networks Telemundo and Universo. Originating as the former's sports division Deportes Telemundo from 1999 to 2015, it broadcasts an array of sports events, including the association football matches from various international football leagues and the Olympic Games, among others.

History

Origins as Deportes Telemundo

The division was originally formed in 1987 as Deportes Telemundo, which at first exclusively served as the sports division of Telemundo, with the acquisition of rights to football matches to select teams from the Mexican Primera División (now Liga MX). Following NBC's $2.7 billion purchase of Telemundo Communications Group on October 11, 2001, Deportes Telemundo began to gradually be integrated into NBC Sports, although it would maintain sports programming rights separate from the main NBC broadcast network and its sister cable channels. Under NBC (which ironically lost the rights to the league that year to ABC), on August 20, 2002, Telemundo signed a three-year agreement with the National Basketball Association (NBA) for the Spanish language broadcast rights to 15 NBA and up to ten WNBA regular season games; Telemundo and the NBA did not renew the deal upon its expiration following the 2004–05 season.

On August 12, 2009, the division's production responsibilities were extended to sister cable network mun2 (now NBC Universo), when it carried an English language broadcast of a World Cup qualifier between the United States and Mexico national teams, which was broadcast as part of a one-day free preview available to most cable and satellite providers though was presented by NBC Sports; and furthermore in January 2010, when mun2 began airing Liga MX games under the brand Fútbol Mexicano (most of which aired as English language simulcasts of Telemundo's Fútbol Estelar soccer telecasts).

On October 28, 2012, NBC Sports also announced a three-year, $250 million deal to televise Premier League  matches, giving Telemundo and mun2 the Spanish language rights (with the latter simulcasting games broadcast in English on NBCSN) beginning with the 2013–14 season, replacing ESPN and Fox Soccer as the league's U.S. broadcasters; prior to the arrangement, NBC had proposed Telemundo for use as a Spanish-language simulcast partner for select sporting events for years after the 2001 purchase.

On July 23, 2013, NBC re-acquired rights to NASCAR beginning in the 2015 season, and announced that it would include the option to air Spanish-language broadcasts on Telemundo and mun2. As a prelude to the contract, mun2 carried the 2014 Toyota 120—the season opener of Mexico's NASCAR Toyota Series at Phoenix Raceway—on February 28, 2014.

On October 22, 2011, Deportes Telemundo acquired the Spanish language rights to broadcast FIFA tournaments beginning 2015 for around $600 million, replacing Univision as the Spanish language broadcaster of events such as the FIFA World Cup for the first time since 1970 (Fox acquired the English language U.S. broadcast rights through a separate agreement). The deal was extended on February 12, 2015, to include rights to the 2018, 2022 and the 2026 FIFA World Cup.

Through NBC's rights agreement with the National Football League (NFL), mun2 carried a Spanish simulcast of a Thanksgiving matchup between the Seattle Seahawks and San Francisco 49ers on November 27, 2014; on February 1, 2015, the rebranded NBC Universo served as the Spanish-language broadcaster of Super Bowl XLIX (which NBC held rights to broadcast that year). On January 13, 2015, NBCUniversal promoted Deportes Telemundo senior vice president of sports Eli Velázquez to the newly created position of Executive Vice President, Sports within the company's Hispanic Enterprises and Content unit, following the departure of the sports division's executive vice president Jorge Hidalgo (whose position was eliminated as part of restructuring of the division).

Reorganization with NBC Sports
On May 16, 2015, during Telemundo's 2015–16 upfront presentation in New York City, it was announced that Deportes Telemundo would be replaced by a new division initially known as NBC Deportes; the new division was formed as a branch of the English-language NBC Sports division, and be responsible for sports content for Telemundo, NBC Universo and related digital platforms. While it retained all existing sports telecast rights and programs aired by both Telemundo and NBC Universo, the latter network also began to expand its sports coverage, primarily in preparation for the 2016 Summer Olympics and the start of the division's contract with FIFA—whose first events included the 2015 U-20 World Cup and Women's World Cup.

It was announced in August 2015 that the division would migrate its operations from Telemundo's headquarters in Hialeah, Florida, to NBC Sports Group's facility in Stamford, Connecticut, in a phased process that was expected to be completed by the second quarter of 2016. Around 70 employees, including production staff and on-air talent, were given a month to decide if they want to remain with NBC Deportes and relocate to Stamford, providing relocation packages to employees who opt to move and severance packages to employees who chose not to move and are unable to find other jobs within NBCUniversal Hispanic Enterprises and Content; most positions within NBC Deportes that were based in the Hialeah offices – with the exception of NBCDeportes.com digital staff, some tech operators employed with the sports unit and production and on-air staff for the late-night magazine program Titulares y Más, which will remain at the Telemundo headquarters – were eliminated in the move, necessitating the employee offers. Around 30 additional staffing positions were expected to be added alongside the existing employees upon the move to Stamford, while the division will invest heavily in the division's infrastructure and sets for its news and analysis programs.

The announced move to Stamford, Connecticut was cancelled in November 2015.   The division would change its name from NBC Deportes to Telemundo Deportes in 2016.

Telemundo Deportes moved into Telemundo Center in Miami when it opened in April 2018.

Programs throughout the years

Telemundo Deportes holds the sports broadcast rights to several sporting events (with much of its programming available through agreements with association football leagues and organizations) for broadcast on Telemundo and Universo, and also produces sports news, magazine and analysis programs that mostly air on Telemundo. Telemundo used to produce Rumbo al Mundial with the Conmebol Qualifying Soccer games for the World Cup, this was huge with Spanish speaking audiences but was not repeated for the 2020 World Cup Qualifier in Qatar.

It also produces several specials in conjunction with organizations to which NBC Sports maintains programming agreement such as the National Football League (NFL).

Current broadcast rights
Events which are held by NBC Sports for their English language channels are designated in Italics.

American football
 NBC Sunday Night Football: (2014–present)
 Super Bowls: All years where NBC holds rights since 2014 (XLIX, LII, LVI)
Association football
 Premier League (2013–present)
 Fútbol Estelar: Liga MX and Liga MX Femenil; used in years where Telemundo has broadcast rights to home matches of specific Liga MX and Liga MX Femenil teams (2020–present for Chivas Guadalajara home matches and selected Chivas Femenil home matches)
 FIFA U-17 World Cup (2015, 2017, 2019, and 2023)
 FIFA U-20 World Cup (2015, 2017, 2019, and 2023)
 FIFA Women's World Cup (2015, 2019, and 2023)
 FIFA World Cup (2018, 2022, and 2026)
 FIFA World Cup - CONCACAF qualifiers (2018 and 2022; except USA and Mexico home matches)
 SheBelieves Cup
 U.S. men's national soccer team (2023–present; except for CONCACAF and Mexico home matches)
 U.S. women's national soccer team (2023–present; except for CONCACAF and Mexico home matches)
Futsal
 FIFA Futsal World Cup (2016, 2020, 2024, and 2028)
Olympic Games
 Juegos Olimpicos por Telemundo
 Summer Olympic Games (2004, 2008, 2012, 2016, 2020, 2024, 2028, 2032)

Other programming
 Boxeo Telemundo (1987–present)
 Ritmo Deportivo (2002–present)
 Rumbo Al Mundial (1987–present)
 Titulares Telemundo (1999–present)
 Titulares Y Mas (2008–present)

Former programs
American Football
Thursday Night Football: (2016–2017)
Association Football
 FIFA Club World Cup (2014–2018)
 Copa América (2019)

Basketball
 NBA en Telemundo (2003–2005)
 WNBA en Telemundo (2003–2005)

Notable personalities

Current

Play-by-play
  Andrés Cantor (lead)
   Sammy Sadovnik
   Copán Álvarez
  Diego Pessolano
  Alejandro López
  Jorge D. Calvo
  Carlos Yustis
  Edgar Lopez
  Omar Amador
  Carlos Mauricio Ramírez
  Geraldine Carrasquero (on loan from ESPN South America)
  Daniella López Guajardo (on loan from Fox Deportes)

Color commentators/Analysts
  Carlos Contreras
  Carlos Hermosillo
  Manuel Sol
  Eduardo Biscayart
  Tony Núñez
  Nicolás Massú
  Jorge Koechlin von Stein
  Frederik Oldenburg
  Walter Reinaldo Roque
  Rolando Cantú
  René Giraldo
  Jorge Andres
  Deyna Castellanos
  Janelly Farías
  Mónica González
  María Sánchez
  Natalia Astrain
  Amelia Valverde
  Melissa Ortiz
  Diana Rincón (on loan from ESPN South America)
  Nicole Regnier (on loan from ESPN South America)

Reporters
  Kaziro Aoyama
   Arantza Fernandez
  Pablo Aguabella

Studio hosts
  Miguel Gurwitz
 Rosina Grosso
  Ana Jurka
  Karim Mendiburu
  Verónica Rodríguez
  Leti Coo
  Carlota Vizmanos
  Ariana Figuera

Former

Play-by-play 

  Félix de Jesús
  Erasmo Provenza

Color commentators/analysts 

  Norberto Longo
  Viviana Vila

References

External links
 
 Titulares Y Más
 Titulares Telemundo
 Ritmo Deportivo
 Fútbol México
 NBC Sports website

 
Telemundo
NBC Sports
Sports television in the United States
 
Soccer on United States television